George Washington Wilson (February 22, 1840 – November 25, 1909) was an American lawyer, politician, and veteran of the Civil War who served two terms as a U.S. Representative from Ohio from 1893 to 1897.

Biography
Wilson was born in Brighton, Ohio, and attended the common schools and Antioch College, Yellow Springs, Ohio.

On August 8, 1862, he enlisted in the Ninety-fourth Regiment, Ohio Volunteer Infantry and was commissioned second lieutenant. While with First Regiment, United States Veteran Volunteer Engineers, he was promoted to First Lieutenant July 2, 1864, and afterward captain. He mustered out of the service October 1, 1865.

He studied law and was admitted to the bar  on August 7, 1866, and practiced in London, Ohio. He served as prosecuting attorney of Madison County 1866–1870, a member of the Ohio House of Representatives 1871–1874, and served in the Ohio State Senate 1877–1881.

Wilson was elected as a Republican to the Fifty-third and Fifty-fourth Congresses (March 4, 1893 – March 3, 1897).

After that, he resumed the practice of law in London, Ohio and served as delegate to the 1896 Republican National Convention, mayor of New London and prosecuting attorney of Madison County.

He died in London, Ohio, November 25, 1909, and was interred in Kirkwood Cemetery.

References

 Retrieved on April 14, 2009

External links
 

Republican Party Ohio state senators
Republican Party members of the Ohio House of Representatives
Union Army officers
Ohio lawyers
County district attorneys in Ohio
Mayors of places in Ohio
Antioch College alumni
People of Ohio in the American Civil War
People from London, Ohio
1840 births
1909 deaths
19th-century American politicians
Republican Party members of the United States House of Representatives from Ohio